Willie C. Williams (May 25, 1925 – August 23, 2011), nicknamed "Curley", was an American Negro league baseball infielder who played for the Newark Eagles, Houston Eagles, New Orleans Eagles and in the minor leagues in a career that spanned from 1945 to 1953.

Born in Orangeburg or Holly Hill, South Carolina, Williams began his career with the Newark Eagles franchise in 1945 and remained with it through 1951, even as the team changed locations - it became the Houston Eagles in 1949 and then the New Orleans Eagles in 1951.

He began his minor league career in 1951, signing with the Chicago White Sox and playing for the Colorado Springs Sky Sox, with whom he hit .297 with four home runs in 20 games. He split 1952 in the White Sox and St. Louis Browns system, hitting .256 in 102 games. In 1953, he suited up for the Carman Cardinals of the independent Mandak League.

On August 23, 2011, he died at the age of 86 in Sarasota, Florida.

References

External links
 and Seamheads
Willie Williams at Negro Leagues Baseball Museum

1925 births
2011 deaths
Houston Eagles players
New Orleans Eagles players
Newark Eagles players
Baseball players from South Carolina
Minor league baseball players
20th-century African-American sportspeople
21st-century African-American people